Elles ne pensent qu'à ça... is a 1994 French comedy film directed by Charlotte Dubreuil. It stars Claudia Cardinale, Carole Laure, and Bernard Le Coq. It was nominated for a Golden Kikito Award for Best Film at the Gramado Film Festival.

The film is based on a comic by Georges Wolinski.

References

External links

French comedy films
1994 films
Films directed by Charlotte Dubreuil
1994 comedy films
Films based on French comics
Live-action films based on comics
1990s French films